Oakwood Center is a major shopping mall in Terrytown, Louisiana, on the West Bank of the Mississippi River in the New Orleans metropolitan area. It was originally named "Oakwood Mall", and some signage and local usage continue to call it that. It is geographically in Terrytown, but the mailing address is in adjacent Gretna, Louisiana. The anchor stores are Dick's Sporting Goods, Old Navy, Shoe Dept. Encore, JCPenney, and Dillard's. There is 1 vacant anchor store that was once Sears.

"Oakwood Mall" opened in 1966, taking advantage of the increased development on the West Bank following the opening of the Crescent City Connection. One of the former anchor stores was D. H. Holmes. It was replaced by a Dillard's store in 1992, and then by Marshalls.

Oakwood Center fell victim to significant damage in the aftermath of Hurricane Katrina. The mall was heavily looted and set on fire on August 31, 2005. Nearly 80% of the stores experienced fire or water damage. The main shopping area was closed during demolition and construction. Two department stores, Sears and Dillard's, along with Dollar Tree, Foot Locker, and the Bank of Louisiana reopened before the entire mall reopened. Oakwood Center completely reopened on October 19, 2007, except for the Mervyns wing.

Forever 21 and Shoe Department Encore replaced the Marshalls.

In 2013, it was confirmed that the Mervyns wing would be torn down for Dick's Sporting Goods.

On January 5, 2017, it was announced that Sears would be closing as part of a plan to close 104 stores nationwide. The store closed in March 2017.

Anchors

Current 
 Dick’s Sporting Goods (82,000 square foot)
 Dillard’s (175,000 square foot)
 JCPenney (157,000 square foot)

Former
 D. H. Holmes (Converted to Dillard’s in 1989, Moved to new building in 1991)
 Mervyn’s (Closed in 2005, Never reopened after Hurricane Katrina, became Dick’s sporting goods in 2013)
Sears (189,600 square foot) (Closed in 2017)

References

External links

 Oakwood Center Mall
 Vintage Photos of Oakwood Mall

Brookfield Properties
Shopping malls in the New Orleans metropolitan area
Shopping malls in Louisiana
Buildings and structures in Jefferson Parish, Louisiana
Tourist attractions in Jefferson Parish, Louisiana
Shopping malls established in 1966
1966 establishments in Louisiana